The 2nd Politburo of the Lao People's Revolutionary Party (LPRP), officially the Political Bureau of the 2nd Central Committee of the Lao People's Revolutionary Party, was elected in 1972 by the 1st Plenary Session of the 2nd Central Committee, in the immediate aftermath of the 2nd National Congress.

The 2nd Politburo witnessed dramatic debates on the topic of the transition to socialism, planned economic activity verus market relations and how to construct a people's democratic dictatorship. The Politburo was divideded between reformers such as Kaysone Phomvihane, who were influenced by economic reforms in China and Vietnam, and the followers of Nouhak Phoumsavan that wanted to strengthen state-control and supported a traditional planned economy based on the Soviet model.

Members

References

Specific

Bibliography
Books:
 

Articles and journals:
 
 
 

1972 establishments in Laos
2nd Politburo of the Lao People's Revolutionary Party